Sir John Rae Reid, 2nd Baronet (1791–1867) was a British merchant and financier. He was a Tory and Conservative politician who sat in the House of Commons between 1830 and 1847.

Early life

Reid was the son of Sir Thomas Reid of Ewell Grove and his wife Elizabeth Goodfellow. He succeeded his father in the baronetcy in 1824

Political life

Reid was the Member of Parliament for Dover, Kent from  1830 to 1831 and from 1832 to 1847.

Slave ownership 

According to the Legacies of British Slave-Ownership at the University College London, Reid was awarded compensation in the aftermath of the Slavery Abolition Act 1833 with the Slave Compensation Act 1837.

Reid was associated with seventeen different claims, he owned over 3000 slaves in British Guiana, Jamaica, St Kitts, Trinidad and the British Virgin Islands. He received over £62,000 in compensation from these claims.

Career 
Reid was head of the firm Reid, Irving & Co., and later a Director (1820 to 1847) of the Bank of England, except when acting as Deputy Governor (1837 to 1839) or Governor (1839 to 1841). In June 2020 the Bank of England issued a public apology for the involvement of Reid, amongst other employees, in the slave trade following the investigation by the Centre for the Study of the Legacies of British Slave-ownership at UCL.

Personal life

He married Maria Louisa, the daughter of Richard Eaton of Stetchworth Park, Cambridgeshire with whom he had 2 sons and a daughter.

References

External links 
 

1791 births
1867 deaths
Baronets in the Baronetage of the United Kingdom
Conservative Party (UK) MPs for English constituencies
Governors of the Bank of England
UK MPs 1830–1831
UK MPs 1832–1835
UK MPs 1835–1837
UK MPs 1837–1841
UK MPs 1841–1847
Tory MPs (pre-1834)
Members of the Parliament of the United Kingdom for Dover
Anglo-Scots
Scottish slave owners
Recipients of payments from the Slavery Abolition Act 1833
British slave owners
19th-century English businesspeople